San Lupo is the name of a hill town and comune in the province of Benevento, in the Campania region of southern Italy.  It is a member of the Titerno "Local Action Group".

The town is located 60 km from the A1 highway, exit at Caserta, or is reachable by the Benevento-Caianello National Road.  The nearest railway station is Naples-Foggia line. There are daily flights to Benevento and Naples.  The town is also accessible by bus, on the line St. Wolf-Naples-Benevento-Campobasso, with links to Benevento (3 trips daily in summer and 3 runs in the winter), Naples (3 trips daily during the summer and 3 runs in the winter) and Campobasso (3 trips daily in summer and 3 runs in the winter).

History
The first settlement dates back to the period between the 10th and 11th century AD by Benedictine monks who were attracted to these lands and called them  "San Lupo and Zosimus." A major earthquake in 1456 caused serious damage, and forced the population to move upstream, where the village was rebuilt. In 1688, another earthquake destroyed much of the rebuilt village. The survivors rebuilt it on the hill above, where homes had not suffered very much damage, due to the rocky nature of the soil.

San Lupo was later a fiefdom of various noble families. In 1877 the town was the starting point of a failed uprising against the Italian government by the anarchists Malatesta and Cafiero. There was mass emigration to the United States, Canada and South America at the end of the 19th century. After the Second World War there was another wave of emigration to Australia.

Nearby Towns
The municipality of San Lupo is surrounded by the following 6 municipalities:
San Lorenzo Maggiore (BN) 	1.3 km,
Guardia Sanframondi (BN) 	3.2 km,
Casalduni (BN) 			5.0 km,
Pontelandolfo (BN) 		5.6 km,
Ponte (BN) 			7.0 km,
& Cerreto Sannita (BN) 		7.1 km.

Festivals
The feast of the patron saint, San Lupo, is celebrated each year on the last Saturday of July.

San Lupo citizens participate in the penitential rite of neighboring Guardia Sanframondi.

References

External links
 San Lupo  

Cities and towns in Campania